Shuluta (Shuluuta) is a rural locality (an ulus) in Tunkinsky District, Republic of Buryatia, Russia. The population was 440 as of 2010. There are 15 streets.

References 

Rural localities in Tunkinsky District